Sacred Games is a mystery/thriller novel by Indian-American author Vikram Chandra published in 2006. Upon release, it received critical acclaim and subsequently won the Vodafone Crossword Book Award.

Premise
Sacred Games runs mostly on two parallel tracks. One winding through the criminal underworld of Mumbai (then Bombay) in the 1980s and 1990s, and the other through a tense modern-day hunt for the explanation behind a notorious dead gangster's bizarre final words. The only Sikh police officer in the city, Inspector Sartaj Singh, is seemingly invited to pursue Mumbai's most legendary crime boss Ganesh Gaitonde. Gaitonde reveals a harrowing timeline and a few hints of the identity of his collaborators before taking his own life.

Publication history
The book earned Chandra a rumored US$1 million advance from HarperCollins. The initial print run was 200,000 copies.  However, the book sold less than expected and it is estimated that the advance gained $655,750. It was critically praised, winning the 2006 Vodafone Crossword Book Award.

Adaptation
Netflix, in partnership with Phantom Films, announced Sacred Games, a Netflix Original series based on the novel in June 2016. The series, primarily in Hindi, was shot on location in India, and released worldwide on Netflix on 6 July 2018. The series features Saif Ali Khan as police officer Sartaj Singh, Nawazuddin Siddiqui as gangster Ganesh Gaitonde and Radhika Apte as RAW analyst Anjali Mathur. The series consists of eight episodes of 45 minutes each directed by Anurag Kashyap and Vikramaditya Motwane. In an interview published on DNA, Saif Ali Khan claimed that Sacred Games will be a four part series.

Awards and nominations

2007: Awarded Salon Book Award
2007: Nominated National Book Critics Circle Award
2006: Awarded Hutch Crossword Book award

See also

Shantaram
Maximum City

References

External links
Review/interview Salon.com

2006 Indian novels
Novels set in India
Partition of India in fiction
HarperCollins books
Research and Analysis Wing in fiction
Indian novels adapted into television shows
Books by Indian authors
Indian political novels
LGBT literature in India
Novels about nuclear war and weapons